There have been six Cunningham baronetcies:

Cunningham baronets of Cunninghamhead, Ayr
Created in the Baronetage of Nova Scotia 4 July 1627
Sir William Cunningham, 1st Baronet (died )
Sir William Cunningham, 2nd Baronet (died 1670)
Sir William Cunningham, 3rd Baronet (died 1724)
Extinct on 3rd Baronet's death without issue

Cunningham baronets of Auchinhervie, Ayr (1st creation)
Created in the Baronetage of Nova Scotia 23 December 1633
David Cunningham, 1st Baronet of Auchinhervie, double baron, Auchenharvie was a Scottish baronetage.
Sir Robert Cunningham, 2nd Baronet of Auchinhervie (died before 1674)
Sir Robert Cunningham, 3rd Baronet of Auchinhervie (died before 1677)
Sir Robert Cunningham, 4th Baronet of Auchinhervie (died 10 July 1715)
Sir James Cunningham, 5th Baronet of Auchinhervie (did not assume baronetcy)
Sir Robert Cunningham, 6th Baronet of Auchinhervie (died 1733) unmarried/under age
Dormant on his death

Cunningham baronets of Robertland
Created in the Baronetage of Nova Scotia 25 November 1630
Sir David Cunningham, 1st Baronet 
from 7th Baronet, c1800, Cunningham-Fairlie

Cunningham baronets of Auchinhervie, Ayr (2nd creation)
Created in the Baronetage of Nova Scotia 3 August 1673
Sir Robert Cunningham, 1st Baronet 
Sir Robert Cunningham, 2nd Baronet 
Extant

Cunningham baronets of Hyndhope, Selkirk
Created in the Baronetage of the United Kingdom 7 July 1942
Sir Andrew Browne Cunningham, 1st Baronet 
He was subsequently created Viscount Cunningham of Hyndhope with which title the baronetcy then merged until its extinction in 1963.

Cunningham baronets of Crookedstone, Killead
Created in the Baronetage of the United Kingdom 22 November 1963
Sir Samuel Knox Cunningham, 1st Baronet  MP for Antrim South 1955–1970 (1909–1976)
Extinct

See also
Cunynghame baronets of Milncraig 
Sir David Cunynghame, 1st Baronet
Montgomery-Cuninghame baronets
Dick-Cunyngham baronets

References

Dormant baronetcies in the Baronetage of Nova Scotia
Extinct baronetcies in the Baronetage of Nova Scotia
Extinct baronetcies in the Baronetage of England
Extinct baronetcies in the Baronetage of the United Kingdom